Joann S. Peterson, M.S.W., A.C.S.W., Dip.C., Ph.D., (July 26, 1934 - January 9, 2007) was an American social worker, counsellor, author and lecturer. She taught seminars internationally, and was the first Director of Education at the Haven Institute.

Personal and professional development

Born premature and abandoned at birth, she struggled with physical developmental challenges as a child; she experienced chronic, unrelenting pain every day of her adult life.  Rather than succumb to a passive life of victimhood, she worked with her challenges, and excelled academically.  Her own experiences of suffering gave her particular insight and empathy for others with difficulties, and she was known as a caring, empathetic counsellor and teacher.  But she was also disciplined and rigorous, and expected her students to embrace personal responsibility without complaint, as she had done.

Career
Peterson earned a B.A. at Willamette University (1956), M.S.W. at University of Washington (1958), Dip.C. from the Haven Institute (1990) and Ph.D. from the Open International University (2000). She did some of the pioneering work in the field of child sex abuse in San Diego, CA.  Later, she was a key figure in the development of mental health services in Bellingham, Washington. She left private clinical practice to assume the position of Director of Education at the Haven Institute on Gabriola Island, B.C. Canada in 1990, and held this position until her death in early 2007.  Peterson developed and led a wide variety of groups for The Haven. She collaborated with Bennet Wong and Jock McKeen for over thirty years. She facilitated personal and professional development seminars throughout North America and Southeast Asia .  Her last book was translated into Chinese in Taiwan.

Contributions

Child sex abuse
Abused in her adoptive family, she had a special affection and ability with youngsters who were undergoing physical, emotional or sexual abuse. She wrote about her experiences, and contributed much to the field in this domain. She taught seminars for individuals and couples in the area of human sexuality.

Family therapy
Her clinical work focused on families in crisis.  She served as a consultant for agencies and trained professionals in psychology and social work for over 40 years. She authored numerous articles, and wrote many research grants in the field of child abuse prevention.

Responsible anger
Peterson authored two books and a DVD about responsible anger expression. Based on the Anger, Boundaries and Safety workshop she developed and led over 15 years, her writing on anger emphasizes the benefits to physical and mental health, and to relationships, of the non-violent, bounded expression of anger.

Human dialogue
In her work, she was always focussed on helping individuals and families to come into human dialogue with each other, overcoming the distances created by objectification. She wrote and taught about separation and loss, mirroring, boundaries and depression. She designed an experiential workshop entitled "Disengaging Depression" which was based on her staunch belief that people can overcome psychological and physical difficulties through courage and personal responsibility.

Publications
.

.
 Peterson, Joann. "Parent Aide Programs: The Reparenting Process", Proceedings of the American Academy of Pediatrics, 1981.
.
 Peterson, Joann. "Management of the Abusive Family", San Diego, CA: Child Protection Center, Children's Hospital,Parent Aide Program, 1981.
 Peterson, Joann. "Child Development", San Diego, CA:Child Protection Center, Children's Hospital,Training Cassettes,1981.
 Peterson, Joann. "Intervention Programs", San Diego, CA: Child Protection Center, Children's Hospital,Training Cassettes, 1981.
 Peterson, Joann. "Sexual Abuse Identification", San Diego, CA: Child Protection Center, Children's Hospital,Training Cassettes, 1981.
 Peterson, Joann. "Identification of High Risk Families", San Diego, CA: Child Protection Center, Children's Hospital and Sharp Hospital,Premature Nursery Project, 1982.
.
 Peterson, Joann. "Sexual Abuse: Issues of Body and Boundary", Cortes Island, BC: Heartwood, Issue #9, Fall 1984.
 Peterson, Joann. "Intervention With Abusive Families", San Diego, CA: Child Protection Center, Children's Hospital,Parent Aide Program, 1990.
 Peterson, Joann. "Choosing Anger", Gabriola Island, BC: Shen, Issue #5, Spring 1990.
.

.

.

.

.

.

.
.
.

References

Sources

.

.
.

.
.

.

.

.

External links
Couples Video Series: Wong, McKeen, Peterson, Nicholls
Joann Peterson Memorial
Remembering Joann Peterson Blog
Joann Peterson "Mirroring: The Discovery of the Self"
The Haven Institute
Joann Peterson Video Clips on Anger, Violence
The Haven Foundation

1934 births
2007 deaths
American health and wellness writers
American women non-fiction writers
Human Potential Movement
American social workers
Willamette University alumni